Manuel de Azambuja Leite Pereira Jardim (6 November 1884, Montemor-o-Velho – 7 June 1923, Lisbon) was a Portuguese painter and art teacher.

Biography 

He studied at the Académie Julian with Jean-Paul Laurens, where he was influenced by the works of Eugène Carrière and Édouard Manet. In 1911, he had his first showing at the Salon with his painting "Le Déjeuner" (Breakfast). During this time, he also made trips to Germany, Italy and Spain. Upon returning, he held a major exhibit at the Salon d’Automne.

He went back to Portugal in 1914 and opened his own art school in Coimbra. While there, he joined with the architect  in an effort to establish a "Sociedade Portuguesa de Arte Moderna", but was unsuccessful. In 1920, he was in Paris again, but remained for only a year and returned home after he was diagnosed with tuberculosis. He died two years later.

In 1925, his friend Viana honored him with a major retrospective at the "Sociedade Nacional de Belas-Artes", along with works by Amadeo de Souza-Cardoso and Santa-Rita Pintor; two other painters who died young. Further exhibitions were held in 1974 and 2011. Most of his works have been in the possession of the Museu Nacional de Machado de Castro since 1952.

References

Further reading
 Pedro Miguel Ferrão, Manuel Jardim: memória de um percurso inacabado, 1884 - 1923, Ed. Câmara Municipal de Montemor-o-Velho, 2013 
 Henrique de Vilhena, A vida do pintor Manuel Jardim, Portugália-editora, 1945

External links

"Memória de um percurso inacabado", an appreciation of Jardim by Júlia de Sousa @ the University of Coimbra.

1884 births
1923 deaths
Portuguese painters
Portuguese male painters
People from Montemor-o-Velho
20th-century deaths from tuberculosis
Tuberculosis deaths in Portugal
Post-impressionist painters